Eberlanzia is a genus of flowering plants belonging to the family Aizoaceae.

Its native range is Namibia and Cape Provinces (part of South Africa).

The genus name of Eberlanzia is in honour of Friedrich Eberlanz, amateur naturalist of Lüderitz Bay in Namibia, and it was published and described in Z. Sukkulentenk Vol.2 on page 189 in 1926.

Known species:

Eberlanzia clausa 
Eberlanzia cyathiformis 
Eberlanzia dichotoma 
Eberlanzia ebracteata 
Eberlanzia gravida 
Eberlanzia parvibracteata 
Eberlanzia schneideriana 
Eberlanzia sedoides

References

Aizoaceae
Aizoaceae genera
Plants described in 1926
Flora of Namibia
Flora of the Cape Provinces
Taxa named by Martin Heinrich Gustav Schwantes